Whit Rae Genoway (born March 13, 1986) is a water polo player from Canada.

He was a member of the Canadian national water polo team, that claimed the silver medal at the 2009 FINA World Championships in Rome, Italy and the silver medal at the 2011 Pan American Games in Guadalajara, Mexico. 
He played at the 2011 World Aquatics Championships.
He was team captain of the Canadian Water Polo Team at the Summer Universiade 2011, in Shenzhen, China.

See also
 List of World Aquatics Championships medalists in water polo

References

External links
 

1986 births
Living people
Canadian female water polo players
Water polo players at the 2011 Pan American Games
World Aquatics Championships medalists in water polo
Pan American Games silver medalists for Canada
Pan American Games medalists in water polo
Medalists at the 2011 Pan American Games